Charles Moeller (12 January 1912 – 3 April 1986) was a Belgian theologian, literary critic and Roman Catholic priest.

Works
 Humanisme et Sainteté. Témoignages de la Littérature Occidentale (1946)
 Sagesse Grecque et Paradoxe Chrétien (1948)
 "Blondel, la Dialectique de l'unique Nécessaire." In: Au Seuil du Christianisme (pp. 99–157, 1952) 
 Littérature du XXe Siècle et Christianisme (6 vols., 1953–1993).
 Silence de Dieu  (Camus • Gide • Huxley • Simone Weil • Graham Greene • Julien Green • Bernanos)
 La foi en Jésus-Christ  (Jean-Paul Sartre • Henry James • Roger Martin du Gard • Joseph Malègue)
 Espoir des Hommes  (Malraux • Kafka • Vercors • Sholokhov • Maulnier • Bombard • Françoise Sagan • Władysław Reymont)
 L'espérance en Dieu notre Père  (Anne Frank • Miguel de Unamuno • Gabriel Marcel • Charles Du Bos • Fritz Hochwälder • Charles Péguy)
 Amours Humaines  (Françoise Sagan • Bertolt Brecht • Saint-Exupéry • Simone de Beauvoir • Paul Valéry • Saint-John Perse)
 L'exil et le Retour  (Marguerite Duras • Ingmar Bergman • Valery Larbaud • François Mauriac • Gertrude von Le Fort • Sigrid Undset)
 L'Homme Moderne devant le Salut (1965)
 Mentalité Moderne et Évangélisation, (1967)
 L'Élaboration du Schéma XIII (1968)

Further reading
 Colleye, Fernand (2007). Charles Moeller et l'Arbre de la Croix. Crise de l'Eglise et désarrois du Monde. La vie d'un théologien du XXéme siècle. Paris: Publibook.

External links
 Charles Moeller

1912 births
1986 deaths
Clergy from Brussels
Belgian literary critics
Belgian non-fiction writers
20th-century Belgian Roman Catholic priests
20th-century non-fiction writers